Saw Min Waing (also known as Pwa Saw) was one of the two consorts of Prince Naratheinga Uzana of Pagan. Naratheinga is regarded by some historians such as G.H. Luce and Than Tun as a king that ruled Pagan although none of the Burmese chronicles mentions him as king. Some historians such as Htin Aung and Michael Aung-Thwin do not recognize Naratheinga as king.

According to inscriptional evidence, she was probably already married to Naratheinga by 1212, and was probably about 18 to 20 years old. Although she was not the first wife (or chief queen) of Naratheinga, she seemed to have been more powerful as her son Uzana became king ahead of the two sons by the chief queen. Her two elder brothers were senior officials at the court. Her second elder brother Manu Yaza (also known as Maha Thaman) rose to be a chief minister of kings Kyaswa and Uzana.

The queen lived to an old age; she was still alive on 9 February 1273 per an inscription dedicated by her at the Min Waing monastery. She was likely dead by October 1277, according to another inscription.

She was the first of the three famous queens with the nickname Pwa Saw (lit. "Queen Grandmother"). The other two were: Saw Hla Wun, the chief queen of kings Uzana and Narathihapate, and Saw Thitmahti, queen of King Kyawswa.

References

Bibliography
 
 
 
 
 

Queens consort of Pagan
1190s births
1270s deaths
13th-century Burmese women
12th-century Burmese women